Louis-Thomas Chabert de Joncaire (1670June 29, 1739), also known as Sononchiez by the Iroquois, was a French army officer and interpreter for New France who worked with the Iroquois tribes during the French and Indian Wars in the early 18th century. He helped negotiate the Great Peace of Montreal in 1701 and founded Fort Niagara in 1720.

Early life
Louis-Thomas Chabert de Joncaire was born in 1670 in Saint-Rémy-de-Provence, France, to esquire Antoine-Marie de Joncaire and Gabrielle Hardi. Joncaire came to Canada in approximately 1687 as a cavalry sergeant in the Governor General's Guard.

Career as an interpreter

Soon after his arrival in Canada, he was captured by members of the Seneca tribe. According to his son Daniel, Joncaire was tortured by the tribe and en route to execution at a stake, but was saved when a woman of the tribe adopted him. During Joncaire's captivity, a cordial relationship was established between him and the Iroquois which continued until his death. The Seneca befriended and trusted Joncaire while Joncaire mastered the Seneca language. By virtue of his diplomatic qualities, he became a valuable auxiliary for New France. After his release, Joncaire had a permanent post near modern-day Geneva, New York, and a home in Montreal.

Beginning in the summer of 1700, Joncaire, Father Bruyas, and Paul Le Moyne de Maricourt were significantly involved in the peace discussions that led to the Great Peace of Montreal of 1701 that ended the second Beaver War. Joncaire successfully negotiated a peace between New France, the Onondaga, Seneca, and other Iroquois tribes (except for the Mohawks).

During the War of the Spanish Succession beginning in 1702, Joncaire preserved Iroquois neutrality by alternatingly presenting gifts to the Seneca and threatening the Seneca with attacks from their western Native American neighbors if they were to break their treaty with New France. In the summer of 1709 during Queen Anne's War, Joncaire and his men assassinated Louis Montour (relative of Madame Montour) on Governor Vaudreuil's orders. Montour was urging the Seneca to grant right-of-way to their western neighbors on the behalf of the New York-based traders who employed him, which threatened the French control over the Seneca.

In August 1711, when New France was threatened by an attack from the English, Joncaire and Michel Maray de La Chauvignerie convinced several Native American tribes to renew their alliance with New France at a banquet in Montreal by singing an Iroquois war song.

Fort Niagara

In early 1720, Vaudreuil assigned Joncaire the task of acquiring permission from the Seneca to construct a French post to defend against a planned English occupation of the area around Niagara Falls. Joncaire convened a meeting of Seneca chiefs and informed them of his desire to have his own house so that he could visit them more frequently. The chiefs told Joncaire that he could construct a house at any location of his choice, so he recruited eight soldiers from Fort Frontenac to construct Fort Niagara roughly eight miles below the Niagara Falls on the east side of the Niagara River. The trading post that they constructed is in modern-day Lewiston, New York.

Joncaire gained permission from the Iroquois to expand Fort Niagara from a trading house to a wooden stockade capable of holding 300 men. He served as the commander of Fort Niagara until 1726.

Later life and death
In 1731, Joncaire was tasked by Governor Charles de la Boische, Marquis de Beauharnois to lead a group of Shawnee migrants from the Susquehanna River to the Allegheny River and prevent them from trading with the English. He was also instructed to convince them to move even further west with a preference for Detroit where there was greater French influence. Joncaire died at Fort Niagara on June 29, 1739, during this task.

Personal life and family
According to Bacqueville de la Potherie, Joncaire married an Iroquois woman in the 1690s.

Joncaire married the 17-year-old Marie-Madeleine Le Gay on March 1, 1706, in Montreal when he was 36 years old. Marie-Madeleine Le Gay was the daughter of Jean-Jérôme Le Gay, Sieur de Beaulieu, a merchant and bourgeois of Montreal, and Madeleine Just. Joncaire and Le Gay had ten children between 1707 and 1723.

Joncaire's eldest son with Le Gay, Philippe-Thomas Chabert de Joncaire, was given by his father to the Seneca at the age of 10 in 1717, had an Iroquois upbringing, and later served as a captain in the colonial French army. In 1753, Governor Jean de Lauson sought to build a fortified trading post at the confluence of the Allegheny River and French Creek at Venango. That year, the English traders were expelled from Venango and Philippe-Thomas Chabert de Joncaire established Fort d'Anjou at the location. Philippe-Thomas was replaced by Michel Maray de La Chauvignerie as the officer in charge of constructing the fort, which eventually became Fort Machault. He died in Canada soon after the end of the Seven Years' War.

Another of their sons, Daniel-Marie Chabert de Joncaire de Clausonne, was also a army officer and interpreter in New France. He established Fort du Portage near Niagara Falls and fought in the Battle of Fort Niagara during the French and Indian War. After leaving for France, he was implicated in the Canada Affair and imprisoned in the Bastille, before returning to America and then dying in Detroit in 1771.

Legacy
The location of the initial trading post that Joncaire commanded near Fort Niagara in 1720 is commemorated by a New York State Historic Marker for "Fort Joncaire" in Lewiston, New York.

See also
 Kondiaronk
 Lower Landing Archeological District

Notes

References

1670 births
1739 deaths
French Army officers
People from Saint-Rémy-de-Provence
Interpreters
French Canadian people of the French and Indian War